Upset is an American band, formed in 2013. The band originally consisted of Ali Koehler on guitar and lead vocals, Jenn Prince on lead guitar and vocals, Chris Juarez on bass, and Patty Schemel on drums. After the recording and release of their debut album, She's Gone, Prince departed the band to work on other projects, with Lauren Freeman joining the band on lead guitar, and Rachel Gagliardi on bass and vocals. Koehler is the former drummer of the bands Best Coast and Vivian Girls. Schemel rose to prominence as the drummer of Hole and currently also drums for the band Death Valley Girls.  The band released their debut album on Don Giovanni Records on October 29, 2013.

Discography

Albums

References

External links
 Lauren Records official website
 Don Giovanni Records official website

Musical groups established in 2013
Don Giovanni Records artists
2013 establishments in California